Mellamastus is a monotypic moth genus in the family Erebidae described by Rego Barros in 1959. Its only species, Mellamastus nero, was first described by Gustav Weymer in 1907. It is found in Brazil.

References

Phaegopterina
Monotypic moth genera
Moths described in 1907
Moths of South America